Pelargonium cucullatum is a hairy, upright, branching, perennial shrub, of  high, that has been assigned to the cranesbill family. It sprouts new stems from the underground rootstock and becomes woody at its base. The white to purplish red, 5-merous, somewhat mirror symmetrical flowers grow in umbel-like clusters, and each contain mostly 7 fertile stamens and 3 infertile staminodes (best checked in the bud) of different length. P. cucullatum has been cultivated as a garden ornamental and house plant since the 17th century. It has been used to breed many modern pelargonium hybrids, notably the Regal pelargoniums. It is called hooded-leaf pelargonium or herba althaea in English and wildemalva in Afrikaans.

Description 
It is fragrant when rubbed. The branches are initially herbaceous and greyish green but become eventually woody and brown. The alternate leaves are crowding near the ends of branches and are hairy in the same manner as the branches. The veins are sunken below the upper leaf surface but stick out on the lower leaf surface.

The inflorescence is a branched flowering stem that bears up to 4 umbels with mostly 3-9, but sometimes as few as only one or as much as 13 flowers each. The flowering stem bears one or two small leaves and two to four green bracts at each branching. The peduncles are sometimes slightly curved when the flowers are stil the in bud, become upright when the flowers are open, and recurve or nod after flowering.

Two larger petals on the upper side of the flower are asymmetric inverted egg-shaped, with dark purple streaks and a reddish purple tinge at the base that dissolves in reddish purple patches. The 10 filaments are white to pale pink in colour and merged at base. The filaments differ in length.

Differences between the subspecies 
Pelargonium cucullatum subsp. cucullatum has somewhat angularly incised leaves, covered in long soft (or villous) hairs. Subsp. strigifolium also has more or less angularly incised leaves, but these are covered in straight hairs that all point in the same direction (or strigose). Finally, the leaves in subsp. tabulare  are not angularly incised, and are villously hairy.

Taxonomy 
The hooded-leaf pelargonium was first collected for science by Dutch botanist Paul Hermann in 1672, and was probably found on the slopes of Table Mountain. As far as known, William Bentinck, 1st Earl of Portland was the first to grow the species in Europe in 1690. The "father of modern taxonomy", Carl Linnaeus described the species in the Hortus Kewensis, a book by William Aiton that was published in 1789, based on a specimen collected somewhere in Africa,
without precise locality, that was illustrated in the Hortus Cliffortianus. Charles Louis L'Héritier de Brutelle assigned it to his genus Pelargonium, creating the new name Pelargonium cucullatum.

Linnaeus had described Geranium cucullatum already in 1753 in the first edition of the Species Plantarum, but it was based on a mix of material of the subspecies cucullatum and strigifolium, making it unfit to base the name of the species or any of these two subspecies on. Charles L'Héritier assigned the mix collection also to Pelargonium cucullatum. In 1891, Otto Kuntze reassigned it again, creating the combination Geraniospermum cucullatum.

In 1759, Nicolaas Laurens Burman distinguished a Geranium cucullatum var. fimbriatum. Phillip Miller, chief gardener at the Chelsea Physic Garden, described Geranium angulosum in the 8th edition of The Gardeners Dictionary in 1768. Charles L'Héritier assigned it to the genus Pelargonium, making the new combination Pelargonium angulosum in the Hortus Kewensis in 1789. In 1891, Otto Kuntze reassigned it again, creating the combination Geraniospermum angulosum. Spanish botanist Antonio José Cavanilles described and illustrated Pelargonium acerifolium in his Monadelphiae Classis Dissertationes Decem. Diss. 4, Quarta Dissertatio Botanica, De Geranio of 1787. Volschenk, Van der Walt & Vorster in their 1982 revision of Pelargonium cucullatum considered all of these names synonymous to subsp. cucullatum.

Charles L'Héritier also distinguished Pelargonium acerifolium in the Hortus Kewensis in 1789. This is not the same plant as Cavanilles had described under the same name two years earlier. William Henry Harvey in 1860 reduced it in 1860 to a variety of L'Héritier's species Pelargonium angulosum. Volschenk, Van der Walt & Vorster renamed it in 1982 to subsp. strigifolium.

Volschenk in the same revision of the species distinguished a new subspecies that he called Pelargonium cucullatum subsp. tabulare.

Pelargonium cucullatum is the type species of the section Pelargonium, the subgenus Pelargonium, and the genus Pelargonium. A recent comparison of homologous DNA resulted in the following relationship tree:

The name of the species cucullatum is Latin and means "hood", which refers to the cupped leaves.

Distribution and conservation 
All three subspecies grow in fynbos vegetation. Subspecies cucullatum occurs on the east coast of the Cape Peninsula and the Kogelberg, growing on sandy and well-drained soil that receives  precipitation per year. The largest population of subsp. tabulare can be found on the south and west coast, and the inland of the Cape Peninsula, but it also occurs around Saldanha Bay. The subsp. strigifolium, is a montane taxon that can be found from near Caledon in the Kleinrivier Mountains in the east to the Hottentots Holland Mountains in the west, and from Baardskeerdersbos in the south to around Bainskloof in the north. It occurs on a variety of soils derived from sandstone, shale, tillite and granite, always above about  altitude, receiving  precipitation annually. The populations of all three subspecies of Pelargonium cucullatum in the wild are stable and their continued survival is considered to be of least concern.

References

Endemic flora of South Africa
Flora of the Cape Provinces
cucullatum
Plants used in traditional African medicine